Wartenberg's migratory sensory neuropathy (also known as Wartenberg's migrant sensory neuritis) is a condition affecting the sensory cutaneous nerves of the limbs, characterised by sudden onset of severe pain upon the movement of a limb that stretches a particular nerve, for example, when turning a key.  The condition comes and goes with sufferers experiencing long periods, potentially years, without complaint interrupted by one or more attacks in succession.
It is considered benign.

References

Human diseases and disorders